WLUV (1520 AM) is a radio station licensed to Loves Park, Illinois, United States, the station serves the Rockford area with a non-directional signal. The station airs a Conservative Christian format, and is an owned and operated affiliate of VCY America.

1520 AM is a United States clear-channel frequency, on which WWKB in Buffalo, New York and KOKC in Oklahoma City, Oklahoma share Class A status.  WLUV must drastically reduce nighttime power in order to protect the nighttime skywave signals of the Class A stations.

History
The station began broadcasting on September 29, 1962. Originally a daytime-only license, WLUV now operates with reduced power at night. The station originally aired a country music format, and was the first country station in the Rockford market. The station was owned by Joe Salvi.

A sister station (broadcast from a different transmission tower), WLUV-FM began broadcasting March 25, 1964 and operated at 96.7 MHz. For many years it simulcast much of WLUV's programming. It was sold and now holds the call sign WKGL-FM and is under the ownership of Townsquare Media. The sale to Townsquare was completed on November 14, 2013.

In August 2021, Christian broadcaster VCY America entered into an agreement to purchase WLUV and translator W287BY for $400,000, and applied to the FCC to convert the stations to non-commercial status. The sale was consummated on November 30, 2021.

Translator
In addition to the main AM station, WLUV is relayed by an FM translator to provide stereo with improved sound and wider nighttime coverage.

References

External links

LUV
VCY America stations
Radio stations established in 1962
1962 establishments in Illinois